Compact car is a vehicle size class — predominantly used in North America — that sits between subcompact cars and mid-size cars. "Small family car" is a British term and a part of the C-segment in the European car classification.

In Japan, small size passenger vehicle is a registration category that sits between kei cars and regular cars, based on overall size and engine displacement limits.

United States

Current definition 
The United States Environmental Protection Agency (EPA) Fuel Economy Regulations for 1977 and Later Model Year (dated July 1996) includes definitions for classes of automobiles.

1930s to 1950s 

The beginnings of U.S. production of compact cars were the late 1940s prototypes of economy cars, including the Chevrolet Cadet and the Ford Light Car. Neither car reached production in the U.S., however Ford SAF in France bought the plans of the "small Ford" and produced the Ford Vedette.

The first U.S produced compact car was the 1950 Nash Rambler. It was built on a  wheelbase, which was nonetheless still a large car by contemporary European standards. It established a new market segment and the U.S. automobile industry soon adopted the "compact" term.

Several competitors to the Nash Rambler arose from the ranks of America's other independent automakers, although none enjoyed the long-term success of the Rambler. Other early compact cars included the Kaiser-Frazer Henry J (also re-badged as the Allstate), the Willys Aero and the Hudson Jet.

In 1954, 64,500 cars sold in the U.S. were imports or small American cars, out of a total market of five million cars. Market research indicated that five percent of those surveyed said they would consider a small car, suggesting a potential market size of 275,000 cars. By 1955, the Nash Rambler that began as a sideline convertible model became a success and was now available in station wagon, hardtop, and sedan body styles. During the Recession of 1958, the only exception to the sales decline was American Motors with its compact, economy-oriented Ramblers that saw high demand among cautious consumers.

By 1959, sales of small imported cars also increased to 14% of the U.S. passenger car market, as consumers turned to compact cars. By this time, smaller cars appealed to people with a college education and a higher income whose families were buying more than one car. Customers expected compact cars to provide improved fuel economy compared to full-sized cars, while maintaining headroom, legroom, and plenty of trunk space.

Between 1958 and 1960, the major U.S. car manufacturers made a push toward compact cars, resulting in the introduction of the Studebaker Lark, Chevrolet Corvair, Ford Falcon, and Plymouth Valiant. These models also gave rise to compact vans built on the compact car platforms, such as the Studebaker Zip Van, Chevrolet Corvair Greenbrier, Ford Econoline, and Dodge A100.

1960s 

During the 1960s, compacts were the smallest class of North American cars, but they had evolved into only slightly smaller versions of the 6-cylinder or V8-powered six-passenger sedan. They were much larger than compacts (and sometimes even mid-sizers) by European manufacturers, which were typically five-passenger four-cylinder engine cars. Nevertheless, advertising and road tests for the Ford Maverick and the Rambler American made comparisons with the popular Volkswagen Beetle.

Compact cars were also the basis for a new small car segment that became known as the pony car, named after the Ford Mustang, which was built on the Falcon chassis. At that time, there was a distinct difference in size between compact and full-size models, and early definitions of vehicle size class were based on wheelbase, with models under 111 inches as compact, 111 to 118 inches intermediate, and over 118 inches as full size, at least until EPA classes based on interior volume of the passenger and cargo compartments were introduced in the later 1970s.

1970s 

In the early 1970s, the domestic automakers introduced even smaller subcompact cars that included the AMC Gremlin, Chevrolet Vega, and Ford Pinto.

In 1973, the Energy Crisis started, which made small fuel-efficient cars more desirable, and the North American driver began exchanging their large cars for the smaller, imported compacts that cost less to fill up and were inexpensive to maintain.

The 1977 model year marked the beginning of a downsizing of all vehicles, so that cars such as the AMC Concord and the Ford Fairmont that replaced the compacts were re-classified as mid-size, while cars inheriting the size of the Ford Pinto and Chevrolet Vega (such as the Ford Escort and Chevrolet Cavalier) became classified as compact cars. Even after the reclassification, mid-size American cars were still far larger than mid-size cars from other countries and were more similar in size to cars classified as "large cars" in Europe. It would not be until the 1980s that American cars were being downsized to truly international dimensions.

1980s to present 

In the 1985 model year, compact cars classified by the EPA included Ford's Escort and Tempo as well as the Chevrolet Cavalier. For the 2019 model year, the best sellers were the Toyota Corolla and Honda Civic.

Japan

Definition 

Small size cars are identified by a licence plate number beginning with "5". In the past, the small size category has received tax benefits stipulated by the Japanese government regulations, such as those in the 1951 Road Vehicle Act.

1950s and 1960s 
In 1955, the Japanese Ministry of International Trade and Industry set forth a goal to all Japanese makers at that time to create what was called a "national car". This established a "compact car" target that was larger than what has become known as the "light car" or the kei car. 

One of the first compact cars that met those requirements was the Toyota Publica with an air-cooled two-cylinder opposed engine, the Datsun 110 series, and the Mitsubishi 500. The Publica and the Mitsubishi 500 were essentially "kei cars" with engines larger than regulations permitted at the time, while the Datsun was an all-new vehicle. These vehicles were followed by the Hino Contessa in 1961, the Isuzu Bellett, Daihatsu Compagno and Mazda Familia in 1963, the Mitsubishi Colt in 1965, and the Nissan Sunny, Subaru 1000, and Toyota Corolla in 1966. Honda introduced its first four-door sedan in 1969, called the Honda 1300. In North America, these cars were classified as subcompact cars.

1970s to present 
By 1970, Nissan released its first front-wheel-drive car that was originally developed by Prince Motor Company which had merged with Nissan in 1966. This was introduced in 1970 as the Nissan Cherry. In 1972, the Honda Civic appeared with the CVCC engine that was able to meet California emission standards without the use of a catalytic converter.

See also 

 Vehicle size class
 Compact MPV
 Compact SUV
 Economy car
 Hot hatch
 Minivan
 Sport compact
 Supermini car
 Compact executive car

References

External links 
 Official US government car size class definitions

Car classifications